The Finance Act 1998 is an Act of the United Kingdom Parliament prescribing changes to Excise Duties; Value Added Tax; Income Tax; Corporation Tax; and Capital Gains Tax. It enacts the 1998 Budget speech made by Chancellor of the Exchequer Gordon Brown to the Parliament of the United Kingdom.

In the UK, the Chancellor delivers an annual Budget speech outlining changes in spending, tax and duty. The respective year's Finance Act is the mechanism to enact the changes.

The rules governing the various taxation methods are contained within the various taxation acts. (For instance Capital Gains Tax Legislation is contained within Taxation of Chargeable Gains Act 1992). The Finance Act details amendments to be made to each one of these Acts.

Taper Relief
Notable changes in the 1998 Act included calculation changes to the taxable proportion of a capital gain by the replacement of indexation allowance with taper relief.

TESSAs
The Act announced the phasing out of Tax-Exempt Special Savings Accounts preventing new accounts being opened after  5 April 1999.

References

United Kingdom Acts of Parliament 1998
1998 in economics